Paul Émile Joseph Bertramd (11 July 1925 – 27 July 2022) was a French Roman Catholic prelate.

Bertrand was born in France and was ordained to the priesthood in 1948. He served as the titular bishop of Tagaria and the auxiliary bishop of the Archdiocese of Lyon, France, from 1975 to 1989 and as the bishop of the Roman Catholic Diocese of Mende from 1989 until his retirement in 2001.

References

1925 births
2022 deaths
20th-century Roman Catholic bishops
21st-century Roman Catholic bishops
Bishops appointed by Pope Paul VI
Bishops appointed by Pope John Paul II
Auxiliary bishops of Lyon
Bishops of Mende